Tatiana Goldobina (Russian: Татьяна Голдобина; born 4 November 1975) is a Russian sport shooter and Olympic medalist. She received a silver medal at the 2000 Summer Olympics in Sydney.

Recipient of the Order of Friendship (2001).

Olympic results

Records

References

1975 births
Living people
Russian female sport shooters
ISSF rifle shooters
Shooters at the 2000 Summer Olympics
Shooters at the 2004 Summer Olympics
Shooters at the 2008 Summer Olympics
Olympic shooters of Russia
Olympic silver medalists for Russia
Sportspeople from Bishkek
Olympic medalists in shooting
Medalists at the 2000 Summer Olympics
21st-century Russian women